Stefan Kaufmann may refer to:

Stefan Kaufmann (musician) (born 1960), drummer with Accept
Stefan Kaufmann (politician) (born 1969), member of Germany's Bundestag
Stefan H.E. Kaufmann (born 1948), microbiologist